Chandauli district is a district of Uttar Pradesh state of India, and Chandauli town is the district headquarters. Chandauli district is a part of Varanasi Division. Chandauli became a separate district for the first time on 20 May 1997.

Pt. Deen Dayal Upadhyay Nagar, a city in the district has the busiest railway station in the North East of Uttar Pradesh. The district includes the Chandraprabha (nature) Sanctuary and a number of waterfalls, including at Devdari and Rajdari. The District contributes to Indian GDP by providing the various cereals from the district including paddy and wheat. Popularly known as the "Dhaan Ka Katora of Uttar Pradesh" because of fertile lands of the Gangetic Plain. Chanduali district made big contributions at the time of freedom movements. In Chanduali there is a village named Ghoswan and Khakhara which is known for the protest against the British for the freedom of India. Chandauli district has its own railway station named Chandauli Majhwar railway station near to district headquarters.

The district has five Vidhan Sabha seats and one member of parliament seat.

Economy
In 2006 the Ministry of Panchayati Raj named Chandauli one of the country's 250 most backward districts (out of a total of 640). It is one of the 34 districts in Uttar Pradesh currently receiving funds from the Backward Regions Grant Fund Programme (BRGF).

Demographics

According to the 2011 census Chandauli district has a population of 1,952,756, roughly equal to the nation of Lesotho or the US state of New Mexico. This gives it a ranking of 238th in India (out of a total of 640). Its population growth rate over the decade 2001-2011 was  18.83%. Chandauli has a sex ratio of 913 females for every 1,000 males. Scheduled Castes and Scheduled Tribes made up 22.88% and 2.14% of the population respectively.

Languages 

At the time of the 2011 Census of India, 81.06% of the population in the district spoke Hindi, 17.60% Bhojpuri and 1.16% Urdu as their first language.

Bhojpuri is the local language of Chandauli. The Bhojpuri variant of Kaithi is the indigenous script of Bhojpuri language.

References

External links

 

 
Districts of Uttar Pradesh
1997 establishments in Uttar Pradesh